is a passenger railway station in the city of Funabashi, Chiba Prefecture, Japan, operated by the private railway operator Keisei Electric Railway.

Lines

Station layout
The station consists of two island platforms connected by a footbridge to an elevated station building.

Platforms

History
Higashi-Nakayama Station opened on 1 September 1953.

Station numbering was introduced to all Keisei Line stations on 17 July 2010. Higashi Nakayama was assigned station number KS19.

Passenger statistics
In fiscal 2019, the station was used by an average of 6,807 passengers daily.

Surrounding area
 Ichikawa City Wakamiya Community Center
 Funabashi City Western Public Hall
 Funabashi City Motonakayama Children's Home

See also
 List of railway stations in Japan

References

External links

 Keisei Station information 

Railway stations in Japan opened in 1953
Railway stations in Chiba Prefecture
Keisei Main Line
Funabashi